Shastrinagar is an area located in Ahmedabad, India. In 2002, it was cited as a "planned residential area".

References

Neighbourhoods in Ahmedabad
Memorials to Lal Bahadur Shastri